Military coups or martial laws in Pakistan began in 1958. Rawalpindi Corps of army was allegedly involved in all the martial laws or military take overs violating the constitution and destroying democratic system in the country, killing of senior politicians, citizens and journalists. Rawalpindi was formerly a small town with no military experience, not seeing enough warfare before British Raj. There was no involvement reported of any other Corps of Pakistan Army in military take overs. There have been numerous successful attempts since 1951. Since its creation in 1947, Pakistan has spent several decades under military rule (1958 – 1971, 1977 – 1988, 1999 – 2008). 

Establishment of Rawalpindi command was allegedly involved in assasinations of former Prime ministers Benazir Bhutto in 2007 and Liaqat Ali Khan in 1951 in Rawalpindi and Lal Masjid incident in which more than 100 students were killed near Holy place of mosque. 

1999-2008 military rule was the most destructive one which resulted in more than 80,000 casualties of Pakistani nationals including security forces and civilians. Financial losses were estimated at Trillions of Rupees.

1953/54 constitutional coup

In 1953, the Governor-General Ghulam Muhammad dismissed the government of the Prime Minister Khawaja Nazimuddin despite it enjoying the support of the Constituent Assembly of Pakistan; then in 1954 he dismissed the Constituent Assembly itself to prevent it changing the constitution to restrict the Governor-General's powers. The failure of the courts to support representative institutions in Federation of Pakistan v. Maulvi Tamizuddin Khan provided a pattern which later led to more open military intervention against elected governments to be justified using a doctrine of necessity.

1958 coup
 
In 1958, the first Pakistani President Major General Iskander Mirza dismissed the Constituent Assembly of Pakistan and the government of Prime Minister Feroz Khan Noon, appointing army commander-in-chief Gen. Ayub Khan as the Chief martial law administrator. Thirteen days later, Mirza himself was exiled by Ayub Khan, who appointed himself president.

1977 coup (Operation Fair Play)

Operation Fair Play was the code name for the coup d'etat conducted at midnight on July 4, 1977, by the Pakistan military, led by Chief of Army Staff General Zia-ul-Haq, against the government of then-Prime Minister Zulfikar Ali Bhutto. General Zia ordered the arrest of Bhutto, his ministers and other leaders of both the Pakistan People's Party and the Pakistan National Alliance. In a nationally televised address, General Zia announced that the National Assembly of Pakistan and all provincial assemblies were dissolved, and that the Constitution of Pakistan was suspended.

The martial law enforced by President General Zia introduced the strict but modern form of conservatism which promoted the nationalistic and religious programmes. Under Zia's dictatorship a heavy islamization of the country took place (the emblem of which were the so called Hudood Ordinances), which steered the country away from Muhammad Ali Jinnah's non-sectarian vision.

1999 coup

In October, 1999 senior officers loyal to army chief Gen. Pervez Musharraf arrested prime minister Nawaz Sharif and his ministers after thwarting the Sharif regime's attempt to dismiss Musharraf and prevent his plane from landing in Pakistan as he returned from a visit to Sri Lanka.

Indirect intervention
The death of Zia-ul-Haq led to the appointment of Ghulam Ishaq Khan as President. Khan had vast, unchecked Presidential powers and was known to be close to the Pakistani military. Khan had dismissed both Benazir Bhutto in 1990 and Nawaz Sharif as Prime Minister in 1993, though the latter resulted in his own resignation and is known in Pakistan as the Waheed Kakar formula.

Unsuccessful coup attempts

1951

There have been numerous unsuccessful coup attempts in Pakistani history. The first noted attempt was the Rawalpindi conspiracy in 1951 led by Maj. Gen. Akbar Khan along with left-wing activists and sympathetic officers against the government of Liaquat Ali Khan, Pakistan's first prime minister. Prominent poet-intellectual Faiz Ahmed Faiz was suspected of involvement.

1980
In 1980, a plot by Maj. Gen. Tajammul Hussain Malik to assassinate Zia-ul-Haq on Pakistan Day on March 23, 1980, was exposed and thwarted.

1995

In 1995, a coup attempt against the government of Benazir Bhutto led by Maj. Gen. Zahirul Islam Abbasi with the support of Islamic extremists was failed.
An alleged coup attempt planned by Mustafa Khar during his exile during General Zia ul Haq's reign was thwarted beforehand due to Seth Abid playing double agent and informing the military about the plot. Allegedly, some disgruntled army officers were provided details of a safe house where weapons procured from India directly by Mustafa Khar after negotiating with an Indian agent in their London High Commission. This has been discussed in great length and detail by Tehmina Durrani in her award-winning book 'My Feudal Lord' where she admits to playing a passive role under duress of her then husband Mustafa Khar.

See also
 Military coups in Argentina
 Military coups in Bangladesh
 Military coups in Nigeria
 Sudanese coup d'état (disambiguation)
 Military coups in Turkey
 List of coups and coup attempts by country

References

 
Pakistan
Pakistan
Military history of Pakistan
Political history of Pakistan
Post-independence history of Pakistan